Meanwhile... is the second album by Trance Mission, released in 1995 through City of Tribes Records.

Track listing

Personnel 
Trance Mission
Beth Custer – alto clarinet, bass clarinet, soprano clarinet, trumpet, percussion, sampler, voice
Stephen Kent – didgeridoo, tuba, cello, ashiko, shaker, cowbell, percussion, voice
John Loose – drums, bodhrán, dumbek, kanjira, riq, shaker, sampler, kalimba
Kenneth Newby – programming, khene, piri, suling, sampler
Production and additional personnel
Robert Anthony – spoken word on "Go Play Outside!" and "Every Stone's Dream"
Egon Dubois – photography
Phillip George – cover art
Eda Maxym – voice on "Go Play Outside!", "Every Stone's Dream" and "Sunrise"
Bob Olhsson – mastering
Georgia Rucker – design
Simon Tassano – production, engineering, mixing

References

External links 
 

1995 albums
Trance Mission albums